Enola Gay: The Men, The Mission, The Atomic Bomb is a 1980 American made-for-television historical drama film about the B-29 mission that dropped the atomic bomb on Hiroshima, Japan at the end of World War II.

Cast

Kim Darby as Lucy Tibbetts
Billy Crystal as Lt. Jake Beser
Patrick Duffy as Col. Paul Tibbetts
Gary Frank as Maj. Tom Ferebee
Gregory Harrison as  Capt. Bob Lewis
Richard Herd as General Leslie Groves
Stephen Macht as William 'Bud' Uanna
Bill Morey as General of the Army George C. Marshall
Than Wyenn as General Curtis LeMay

External links

1980 films
1980 television films
American television films
American war films
Films about the atomic bombings of Hiroshima and Nagasaki
Films directed by David Lowell Rich
Films with screenplays by James Poe
Japan in non-Japanese culture
NBC network original films
Pacific War films
1980s English-language films
1980s American films